Alfred James Leslie (11 July 1900 – 1 February 1961), known as Alec Leslie, was a Scottish professional footballer who played as a left half.

Born in Greenock, Leslie was an influential defensive midfielder who played in Scotland with St Mirren and Morton, and appeared in 143 games for Birmingham, including 132 top flight League games and an appearance at Wembley in the 1931 FA Cup Final. A niggling knee injury disrupted his career; he played his last game for Birmingham in September 1931 before finally retiring in 1932. After football, he ran a pub and worked for the Inland Revenue. He died in Birmingham, aged 60.

Honours 
Birmingham
 FA Cup finalist: 1931

References 

1900 births
1961 deaths
Footballers from Greenock
Scottish footballers
Association football wing halves
St Mirren F.C. players
Port Glasgow Athletic Juniors F.C. players
Greenock Morton F.C. players
Torquay United F.C. players
Birmingham City F.C. players
English Football League players
Scottish Football League players
Scottish Junior Football Association players
FA Cup Final players